The SIPAR is a French NGO that works toward the reconstruction of Cambodia through education of the youth. The NGO’s mission is to fight illiteracy, as the Cambodian literacy rate is close to 55%. The NGO employees 35 Cambodians in Phnom Penh, and several French people in  its French headquarters located in Versailles.

Goals 
The SIPAR builds school libraries, to allow children to learn to read. Its members also work on developing libraries on the move using buses to reach the most isolated inhabitants of country. Since 2000, the SIPAR publishes books in Khmer.

Achievements 
230 libraries were built and opened in primary schools, with more than 2 000 books in Khmer available,
2000 librarians were trained,
12 000 teachers trainees initiated
10 projects of communal educational services development
8 Mobile Libraries are used to bring books to the poorest,
26 centers of education for all (CEFA: commune libraries) were opened in rural area allowing people to have access to different reading materials (books and other educational tools) and to share their experiences,
11 prison libraries
95 titles for young people in Khmer were published in more than 1 000 000 copies over the past 10 years,
90 000 books were donated to different provincial teacher training colleges in Cambodia.

External links 
  SIPAR

Non-profit organizations based in France
Education in Cambodia